Pieter Beets (7 March 1900 – 28 April 1996) was a Dutch cyclist. He competed in two events at the 1920 Summer Olympics.

See also
 List of Dutch Olympic cyclists

References

External links
 

1900 births
1996 deaths
Dutch male cyclists
Olympic cyclists of the Netherlands
Cyclists at the 1920 Summer Olympics
Cyclists from Amsterdam
20th-century Dutch people